Solar power in Alaska has been primarily used in remote locations, such as the Nenana Teen Center near Fairbanks, where long summer days provide most of the electricity generated. In 2015, Alaska ranked 45th in installed solar among U.S. states. Rooftop solar panels could provide 23% of all electricity used in Alaska. Net metering is available for PV systems up to 25 kW but is limited to 1.5% of average demand. IREC best practices, based on experience, recommends no limits to net metering, individual or aggregate, and perpetual roll over of kWh credits.

In 2011, Alaska's largest solar array was the 17.28 kW array installed on a building in Anchorage. A 12 kW solar array installed in Lime Village in July 2001 helped reduce electricity costs.

Annual insolation and thus power production per capacity installed in Alaska is similar to central Europe, where Germany became a leader in worldwide solar power use in the years around 2010.

Statistics

See also

List of power stations in Alaska
Wind power in Alaska
Solar power in the United States
Renewable energy in the United States

References

External links

Incentives and Policies

Energy in Alaska
Alaska